The following is a list of episodes in the Transformer series, Transformers: Energon. They tell the story of part 2 of the Unicron Trilogy: The Quest for Energon.

Episodes
The series consists of only one season of 52 episodes.

References

Lists of anime episodes
Energon